Guillaume Thierry (born 15 September 1986) is a track and field athlete from the Republic of Mauritius. He first represented his country at pole vault in which he competed at the 2003 World Youth Championships in Athletics held in Sherbrooke, Canada. He now competes in the decathlon and holds the Mauritian national record set on 11–12 September 2013 in Nice, France at the VII Francophone Games. He is the first Mauritian ever to score more than 7000 points in this event.

Private life
Patrick Guillaume Llyod Thierry was born in Moka, La Clinique Mauricienne. He went to college at St Andrews School and then attended the University of Mauritius where he completed a Degree in Management in August 2008 and a Master in Human Resource Studies in November 2010. He also completed computer studies at ICL (Innovative and Creative Learning Ltd.) on Computer Repairs and Maintenance and Networking.
He married Anna-Louisa Leveque on 15 December 2012. Their daughter Colleen was born on 17 May 2013.

Sporting career

Thierry's was first coached by Jean Chelin and then by Jacque Dudal.
When Dudal had medical issues and left Mauritius for further medication Thierry trained alone for a while and then spent three weeks in South Africa with Bob Cervenka. During this time he finished 13th, with a new National Record of 4.70m, at the World Youth Championships. He was potted by decathlon coach Aleksandr Nevskiy and changed to this event after finishing his Higher School Certificate.

Personal bests
All events referenced from All-Athletics.com.

International results

References

1986 births
Living people
People from Moka District
Mauritian male pole vaulters
Mauritian decathletes
Commonwealth Games competitors for Mauritius
Athletes (track and field) at the 2006 Commonwealth Games
Athletes (track and field) at the 2010 Commonwealth Games
Athletes (track and field) at the 2014 Commonwealth Games
African Games gold medalists for Mauritius
African Games medalists in athletics (track and field)
Athletes (track and field) at the 2007 All-Africa Games
Athletes (track and field) at the 2011 All-Africa Games
Athletes (track and field) at the 2015 African Games